The 1990 European Judo Championships were held in Frankfurt, Germany from 10 to 13 May 1990.

Medal overview

Men

Women

Medal table

Results overview

Men

60 kg

65 kg

71 kg

78 kg

86 kg

95 kg

95+ kg

Open class

Women

48 kg

52 kg

56 kg

61 kg

66 kg

72 kg

72+ kg

Open class

References 
 Results of the 1990 European Judo Championships (JudoInside.com)
 

E
European Judo Championships
1990 in West German sport
Judo competitions in Germany
Sports competitions in Frankfurt
International sports competitions hosted by West Germany
May 1990 sports events in Europe
1990s in Frankfurt